United for a New Alternative was an Argentine Peronist political coalition, running for the 2015 Argentine general election. It is composed by the Renewal Front, the Christian Democratic Party and the Integration and Development Movement. Sergio Massa won the primary elections against José Manuel de la Sota, and runs for president for UNA.

History
Sergio Massa and the governor (until then) of the Córdoba province José Manuel de la Sota formalize an agreement to build an electoral space that brings together a greater option to vote against the Front for Victory.

In June 2015, both candidates appeared in a television debate ahead of the primary elections, where they discussed economy, security and development.

UNA was the third force of the PASO.  Between its two candidates (Massa and De la Sota) the alliance got 4,649,701 votes, approximately 20.63% of the electorate, with Massa being the winner of the internal one. With this result, Sergio Massa and his candidate for vice president Gustavo Sáenz were consecrated as the official binomial of the front for the general elections of October 25.

Electoral performance

President

Congressional elections

Chamber of Deputies

Senate elections

References

2015 establishments in Argentina
Defunct political party alliances in Argentina
Peronist parties and alliances in Argentina
Conservative parties in Argentina